Norman Mauskopf (born 1949 in Brooklyn, New York) is an American documentary photographer who has published three books. Mauskopf currently resides in Santa Fe, New Mexico.

Work and Career
Norman Mauskopf has been a documentary photographer and photographic educator for over 30 years. He was born in Brooklyn, New York in 1949. Mauskopf's parents had fled Czechoslovakia following World War II and settled in New York City in 1947. While living in New York his parents worked in a clothing factory. In 1951 the Mauskopf family relocated to Washington D.C., where they lived above a three-aisle grocery shop his parents owned. His parents operated the store as a family business for 34 years  before retiring in 1985. His sister, Roslynn Renee Mauskopf is a United States District Judge serving on the United States District Court for the Eastern District of New York.

He studied and taught photography at Art Center College of Design in Pasadena, California. Norman Mauskopf has also taught at Maine Media Workshops and Santa Fe Photographic Workshops. He has completed assignments for numerous magazines, including Wired, Islands, Travel & Leisure, Outside Magazine, and Rolling Stone. He has had two exhibitions at Visa pour l'Image, the International Festival of Photojournalism  in Perpignan, France.

In 2002, Mauskopf was awarded a W. Eugene Smith Fellowship.

Mauskopf's work is currently displayed at  the Verve Gallery of Photography in Santa Fe, New Mexico.

Books
Mauskopf has published three award-winning books; a fourth is expected during the second half of 2010. 
His first book, Rodeo, looked into the lives of professional rodeo cowboys. Author Ben Maddow wrote in the introduction to Rodeo, "they are not merely photographs but observations deeply seen and deeply felt... Mauskopf has uncovered something profound and instinctive." The book was awarded Best of Show by the Art Directors Club of Los Angeles.

The second book, Dark Horses, documents the world of thoroughbred horse racing and was described as "classic photojournalism slyly refracted through prisms of drama, majesty and humor."

The third book, A Time Not Here, documents the musical and spiritual traditions of African Americans in Mississippi. In a review Graphis Inc. writes: "In his landmark documentation of the region, chronicled in "A Time Not Here", Norman Mauskopf captures it all. In stark, high-contrast black-and-white photos, the viewer strolls into Po’ Monkey’s Lounge for a cold beer and is then baptized into the murky, cypress tree laden tributaries of the Mississippi River. Mauskopf accurately depicts a region whose clock has stopped mid 20th century, but somehow maintains everything else which is truly important. The book, first released in 1997, is a monumental achievement, and Graphis heralds it as a book that matters. "

A fourth book, Descendants, on northern New Mexico Hispanic culture is scheduled for the second half of 2010. Descendants  will feature an original text by poet Jimmy Santiago Baca.

Norman Mauskopf has also completed a rare documentary about the legal brothels of Mustang, Nevada.

References

External links

TWIN PALMS PUBLISHERS • TWELVETRESS PRESS
LA Times 12/22/85:  Rodeo Lassos a City Boy's Heart
NY Daily News 2/13/99: Supporter Say Gov's Schools Probe Chief is more than up to task: She's Bred for Battle
Verve Gallery of Photography
BLACK AND WHITE MAGAZINE March 2009, Page 82
Maine Media Workshops
Santa Fe Photographic Workshops
Through the Lens: Creating Santa Fe - Photo Archives at the Palace of the Governors
The Galisteo Basin Photography Project, a benefit exhibition by renowned fine-art and documentary New Mexico photographers
Galisteo Basin Photography Project Online Gallery
Wired Magazine: Breaking the Law of Gravity - June 2003
Wired.com Is Phoenix Burning? - 4.07
Mother Jones Magazine - Nov/Dec 1997 - Front Cover
photo-eye Magazine - Best of 2009
Santa Fean Magazine - Top Talent - June-July 2008
Wired Magazine UK - Beats Skinning Hogs - Issue 1.02 - June 1995
Santa Fe New Mexican -THE SUBCONSCIOUS RISES TO THE SURFACE - January 26, 2007

American photographers
1949 births
Living people
Documentary photographers